The Voice of the Philippines is a singing reality competition on ABS-CBN. Since its inception, its contestants (dubbed as "artists" in the show) have released various albums under MCA Music and Star Records, ABS-CBN's record label arm.

Singles

During The Voice of the Philippines

After The Voice of the Philippines

Albums

By artist

Season albums

References

External links
Official website
 The Voice of the Philippines on ABS-CBN

The Voice of the Philippines